The Lee, Higginson & Company Bank Building is a historic bank building located at 41 Broad Street in the Financial District of Lower Manhattan, New York City. The structure was designed by architects Cross & Cross and built in 1928–1929. It is a 10-story, Classical Revival style, with a top floor penthouse. It features a slightly curved front facade, architectural sculpture by Leo Friedlander, and murals by Griffith B. Coale.

It was added to the National Register of Historic Places on June 7, 2006. In 2007, it was designated as a contributing property to the Wall Street Historic District, a NRHP district.

See also
National Register of Historic Places listings in Manhattan below 14th Street

References

1928 establishments in New York City
Bank buildings on the National Register of Historic Places in New York City
Broad Street (Manhattan)
Commercial buildings completed in 1929
Commercial buildings on the National Register of Historic Places in Manhattan
Financial District, Manhattan
Neoclassical architecture in New York City
Office buildings in Manhattan
Historic district contributing properties in Manhattan
Individually listed contributing properties to historic districts on the National Register in New York (state)